The UK B-Boy Championships is a hip-hop dance competition held annually in the United Kingdom. UK B-Boy Championships, alongside Battle of the Year and R-16 Korea, is regarded to be one of the main International B-Boy Championships held every year. There are national qualifiers worldwide where dancers compete for the opportunity to represent their country at the international final held in London. The event features solo breakers, poppers, hip-hop dancers and b-boy crews from across the globe. It also host DJs and graffiti artists from other countries.

The Championships brings together dancers from around the globe—including the US, Japan, Korea, Russia, China, Holland and Scandinavia—who have won the preliminary tournaments. After a five-month search, staging eight international eliminations, the winners all converge at the Brixton Academy every year to take part in the international final. Since 2014, UK B-Boy Championships partnered up with the World B-Boy Series and helped create Undisputed, an event to crown the solo world B-Boy champion. In 2015, the UK B-Boy Championships were not held.

Past UK B-Boy Championship results

Past Solo B-Boy Champions results

Past Seven2Smoke results

2017 World Finals results

2019 B-Boy Crew Championships
Crews in bold won their respective battles.

2016 World Finals results

2016 B-Boy Crew Championships
Crews in bold won their respective battles.

2016 Undisputed Solo B-Boy Battle
Individuals in bold won their respective battles.

2014 World Finals results

2014 B-Boy Crew Championships
Location: Birmingham, England

Crews in bold won their respective battles.

2014 Undisputed Solo B-Boy Battle
Location: Birmingham, England

Date: 25 & 26 October 2014

Individuals in bold won their respective battles.

Lilou earned the sixth bid to the Undisputed World BBoy Series at the end of the 2014 year by winning UK Bboy Championships.

2013 World Finals results

2013 B-Boy Crew Championships
Location: Birmingham, England

2012 World Finals results
Location: Birmingham, England

2011 World Finals Result

References

External links
 Official Website

Breakdance
Street dance competitions
Competitions in the United Kingdom
Annual events in the United Kingdom
Dance in the United Kingdom